Kurt Wüsthoff (1897–1926) was a German First World War fighter ace credited with 27 confirmed aerial victories. Flying combat with Jagdstaffel 4 of the Imperial German Air Service, he shot down 24 enemy airplanes and three observation balloons between June 1917 and 10 March 1918. A 28th victory is uncounted for unknown reasons.

The victory list

The victories of Kurt Wüsthoff are reported in chronological order, which is not necessarily the order or dates the victories were confirmed by headquarters.

Abbreviations were expanded by the editor creating this list.

Endnotes

References

Aerial victories of Wüsthoff, Kurt
Wüsthoff, Kurt